Unsung Heroes or Unsung Hero may refer to:
 Unsung Heroes, a North Korean film series
 The Unsung Heroes (film), a 2017 documentary film
 BBC Sports Unsung Hero Award, a BBC award for unrecognised contribution in sport
 Unsung Heroes (Dixie Dregs album), 1981
 Unsung Heroes (Ensiferum album), 2012
 Song Summoner: The Unsung Heroes, a 2008 iPod video game
 Unsung Heroes of American Industry, a short story collection by Mark Jude Poirier
 Unsung Hero (magazine), a music magazine
 "Unsung Hero" (song), a 2022 song by For King & Country
 "Unsung Hero", a song by Tina Arena from the 1997 album In Deep

See also
 Unsung (disambiguation)
 Nameless Hero (disambiguation)